The Northwest Territories, one of Canada's territories, has established several territorial symbols.

Symbols

References

 
Northwest Territories
Symbols
Canadian provincial and territorial symbols